Paralligatoridae is an extinct family of neosuchian crocodyliforms that existed during the Jurassic and Cretaceous periods. It includes the genera Paralligator, Brillanceausuchus, Kansajsuchus, Shamosuchus, Scolomastax, Sabresuchus, Rugosuchus, Batrachomimus and Wannchampsus, as well as the yet-unnamed "Glen Rose form".

Evolution
Phylogenetic analyses of crocodyliforms find Paralligatoridae to nest within Neosuchia, a large clade (evolutionary grouping) that also includes modern crocodylians. In crocodyliform phylogeny, paralligatorids are usually found near the base of Neosuchia, outside the clade Eusuchia, which includes crocodylians and their closest relatives. Below is a cladogram from Montefeltro et al. (2013) showing the phylogenetic relationships of Paralligatoridae:

References

Late Jurassic crocodylomorphs
Early Cretaceous crocodylomorphs
Late Cretaceous crocodylomorphs
Oxfordian first appearances
Maastrichtian extinctions
Prehistoric reptile families